Eurysticta coomalie is a species of damselfly in the family Isostictidae,
commonly known as a Coomalie pin. 
It is endemic to the northern area of Northern Territory of Australia, where it inhabits streams and pools.

Eurysticta coomalie is a small to medium-sized damselfly, pale brown with a bronze-green colouring.

Gallery

See also
 List of Odonata species of Australia

References 

Isostictidae
Odonata of Australia
Insects of Australia
Endemic fauna of Australia
Taxa named by J.A.L. (Tony) Watson
Insects described in 1991
Damselflies